The Show Champion Chart is a record chart on the South Korean MBC M television music program Show Champion. Every week, the show awards the best-performing single on the chart in the country during its live broadcast.

As of  2023, 4 singles have reached number one on the chart, and 4 acts has been awarded a first-place trophy. "Teddy Bear" by STAYC currently holds the highest score of the year, with 6,240 points on the February 22 broadcast.

Chart history

Notes

References 

2023 in South Korean music
2023 record charts
Lists of number-one songs in South Korea